Bandor-e Sofla (also Romanized as Bāndor-e Soflá; also known as Bandarābād-e Pā’īn, Bāndarābād-e Soflá, and Bāyandor-e Soflá) is a village in Mansuri Rural District, Homeyl District, Eslamabad-e Gharb County, Kermanshah Province, Iran. At the 2006 census, its population was 116, in 29 families.

References 

Populated places in Eslamabad-e Gharb County